Adolf Kneser (19 March 1862 – 24 January 1930) was a German mathematician.

He was born in Grüssow, Mecklenburg, Germany and died in Breslau, Germany (now Wrocław, Poland).

He is the father of the mathematician Hellmuth Kneser and the grandfather of the mathematician Martin Kneser.

Kneser is known for the first proof of the four-vertex theorem that applied in general to non-convex curves.
Kneser's theorem on differential equations is named after him, and provides criteria to decide whether a differential equation is oscillating. He is also one of the namesakes of the Tait–Kneser theorem on osculating circles.

Selected publications

; 
;

References

External links
 

1862 births
1930 deaths
19th-century German mathematicians
20th-century German mathematicians
Academic staff of the University of Tartu